Kateřina Tomalová (born 10 April 1992) is a Czech badminton player. Trained at the TJ Sokol Klimkovice, Tomalová made her international debut in 2004, and later joining the national team in 2007. She was a champion at the 2012 National Championships in the women's doubles. Tomalová entered the Badminton Europe Centre of Excellence (CoE) program in 2019. She competed at the 2015 and 2019 European Games.

Achievements

BWF International Challenge/Series 
Women's singles

Women's doubles

  BWF International Challenge tournament
  BWF International Series tournament
  BWF Future Series tournament

References

External links 
 

1992 births
Living people
Sportspeople from Ostrava
Czech female badminton players
Badminton players at the 2015 European Games
Badminton players at the 2019 European Games
European Games competitors for the Czech Republic